The Rainbow People is a 1984 book by Richard Collier.  The book describes a subculture of transatlantic-based wealthy hedonists. Collier says, "The era of the Rainbow People opened with the coronation of a prince called 'Tum-Tum' as Britain's Edward VII in 1902 and closed in 1975 with the death of Aristotle Onassis, dubbed 'Daddy-O' by Women's Wear Daily."

Notes

1984 non-fiction books